Beryozovskaya is a rural locality (a stanitsa) and the administrative center of Beryozovskoye Rural Settlement, Danilovsky District, Volgograd Oblast, Russia. The population was 1,769 as of 2010. There are 22 streets.

Geography 
Beryozovskaya is located in forest steppe, on the left bank of the Medveditsa River, 31 km southwest of Danilovka (the district's administrative centre) by road. 1-y Plotnikov is the nearest rural locality.

References 

Rural localities in Danilovsky District, Volgograd Oblast